"Semi-Mental" is a song by Biffy Clyro and the first single from their fourth album, Puzzle, and is a download only single. It was released on 25 December 2006. The song was not UK singles chart eligible as at the time, downloads only counted towards charts sales if there was a physical release.

Overview
Simon Neil has commented on the song, saying

The song was also named single of the week by Kerrang! magazine. At the beginning of the music video, the words "Play Louder" are displayed. This is a reference to Audioslave's video for "Cochise", which displays the words "Play Loud" at the beginning

Track listing
Songs and lyrics by Simon Neil. Music by Biffy Clyro.
Digital download
"Semi-Mental" – 3:22

Personnel
 Simon Neil – guitar, vocals
 James Johnston – bass, vocals
 Ben Johnston – drums, vocals
 Garth Richardson – producer

Notes

External links
 "Semi-Mental" Lyrics
 "Semi-Mental" Guitar Tablature
 

Biffy Clyro songs
2007 singles
Songs written by Simon Neil
Song recordings produced by Garth Richardson
2006 songs
14th Floor Records singles